Valdrin Vatnikaj (born September 28, 1988) is an Albanian-Belgian kickboxer who competes in the lightweight and welterweight divisions. In 2009, he won the WFCA European Championship before becoming a world champion in 2010 by taking the Kombat League 63.503 kg/140 lb world title.

Career
Vatnikaj is a training partner of Albert Kraus and Rico Verhoeven at the SuperPro Sportcenter Zevenbergen in Zevenbergen, Netherlands. He became the WFCA European Champion in 2009 and won the Kombat League 63.503 kg/140 lb world title the following year.

He challenged Jarkko Jussila for his WAKO Pro European Full Contact Light Welterweight (-64.5 kg/142 lb) Championship at Fight Festival 30 in Helsinki, Finland on March 12, 2011, losing a unanimous decision after ten, two-minute rounds. Vatnikaj hit Jussila with lighting fast counterstrikes throughout the fight, but the Finn's constant pressure and reach advantage was too much for him in the end.

After fighting on the European circuit for a number of years, Vatnikaj debuted on kickboxing's biggest stage, K-1, when he faced off with flashy karateka Kizaemon Saiga in a non-tournament bout at the K-1 World MAX 2011 -70kg Japan Tournament Final in Osaka, Japan on September 25, 2011. Saiga's kicks made the difference in an otherwise uneventful fight as the Japanese fighter cruised to a unanimous decision win.

He knocked out Emil Kerimov via second round left hook at MaxPain in Genk, Belgium on February 10, 2012.

Vatkinaj was a competitor in the A1 World Combat Cup's 32-man 63.5 kg/140 lb tournament held throughout 2012. After knocking out Antony Plouvier at the tournament's opening round in Genk, Belgium on March 10, he then outpointed Mansour Yaqubi in the second round in Eindhoven, Netherlands on April 7 to book his place at the finals, featuring the eight remaining fighters and held in Eindhoven on September 22. He took a decision win over Redouane Boukerch in the quarter-finals but lost to Papuna Margvelashvili by the same method in the semis.

Replacing Rachid Boumalek on short notice, he entered the Thai Fight 2012 67 kg/147 lb Tournament and faced the eventual tournament winner Singmanee Kaewsamrit in the quarter-finals in Bangkok, Thailand on October 23, 2012. Vatnikaj opened strong in the first round, connecting with a sweep and some clean punches, but things soon became one way traffic for the Thai in the second round. Singmanee landed two rounds of brutal unanswered body and leg kicks to take home the comfortable decision win.

He fought David Codron in a WKN European Full Contact Super Lightweight (-66.7 kg/147 lb) title match in Pernes-les-Fontaines, France on February 23, 2013 and lost on points after ten, two minute rounds.

Championships and awards

Kickboxing
Kombat League
Kombat League World 63.503 kg/140 lb Championship
World Full Contact Association
WFCA European Championship

Kickboxing record

|-
|-  bgcolor="#FFBBBB"
| 2013-03-16 || Loss ||align=left| Mohamed Galaoui || Explosion Fight Night 7 || Châteauroux, France || Decision || 3 || 3:00
|-
|-  bgcolor="#FFBBBB"
| 2013-02-23 || Loss ||align=left| David Codron || World GBC Tour || Pernes-les-Fontaines, France || Decision || 10 || 2:00
|-
! style=background:white colspan=9 |
|-
|-  bgcolor="#FFBBBB"
| 2012-10-23 || Loss ||align=left| Singmanee Kaewsamrit || Thai Fight 2012 67 kg/147 lb Tournament, Quarter Finals || Bangkok, Thailand || Decision || 3 || 3:00
|-
|-  bgcolor="#FFBBBB"
| 2012-09-22 || Loss ||align=left| Papuna Margvelashvili || A1 World Combat Cup 63.5 kg/140 lb Tournament, Semi Finals || Eindhoven, Netherlands || Decision || 3 || 3:00
|-
|-  bgcolor="CCFFCC"
| 2012-09-22 || Win ||align=left| Redouane Boukerch || A1 World Combat Cup 63.5 kg/140 lb Tournament, Quarter Finals || Eindhoven, Netherlands || Decision || 3 || 3:00
|-
|-  bgcolor="CCFFCC"
| 2012-04-07 || Win ||align=left| Mansour Yaqubi || A1 World Combat Cup 63.5 kg/140 lb Tournament, Second Round || Eindhoven, Netherlands || Decision || 3 || 3:00
|-
|-  bgcolor="CCFFCC"
| 2012-03-10 || Win ||align=left| Antony Plouvier || A1 World Combat Cup 63.5 kg/140 lb Tournament, First Round || Genk, Belgium || KO || || 
|-
|-  bgcolor="CCFFCC"
| 2012-02-10 || Win ||align=left| Emil Kerimov || MaxPain || Genk, Belgium || KO (left hook) || 2 || 
|-
|-  bgcolor="#FFBBBB"
| 2011-10-22 || Loss ||align=left| Yuri Zhukovskiy || W5 Grand Prix || Moscow, Russia || Decision (unanimous) || 3 || 3:00
|-
|-  bgcolor="#FFBBBB"
| 2011-09-25 || Loss ||align=left| Kizaemon Saiga || K-1 World MAX 2011 -70kg Japan Tournament Final || Osaka, Japan || Decision (unanimous) || 3 || 3:00
|-
|-  bgcolor="#FFBBBB"
| 2011-03-12 || Loss ||align=left| Jarkko Jussila || Fight Festival 30 || Helsinki, Finland || Decision (unanimous) || 10 || 2:00
|-
! style=background:white colspan=9 |
|-
|-  bgcolor="#FFBBBB"
| 2010-11-20 || Loss ||align=left| Ionuţ Atodiresei || 2010 Local Kombat Sibiu || Sibiu, Romania || Decision || 3 || 3:00
|-
|-  bgcolor="#FFBBBB"
| 2010-10-31 || Loss ||align=left| David Da Costa || || || Decision || 5 || 3:00
|-
|-  bgcolor="CCFFCC"
| 2008-08-08 || Win ||align=left| Alessandro Alias || || Sardinia, Italy || KO (right cross) || 1 || 3:00
|-
|-
| colspan=9 | Legend:

References

External links
 Official K-1 profile
 Fight Life profile

1988 births
Living people
Albanian male kickboxers
Belgian male kickboxers
Lightweight kickboxers
Welterweight kickboxers
Albanian Muay Thai practitioners
Belgian Muay Thai practitioners
Albanian emigrants to Belgium
Albanian expatriates in the Netherlands
Belgian expatriates in the Netherlands
Place of birth missing (living people)
SUPERKOMBAT kickboxers